Franklin John Maloney (March 29, 1899 – September 15, 1958) was a Republican member of the U.S. House of Representatives from Pennsylvania.

Franklin J. Maloney was born in Philadelphia.  He graduated from Temple University Law School in 1922, and is still considered one of their notable graduates.  He was an unsuccessful Republican candidate for election in 1944.

Maloney was elected as a Republican to the 80th Congress in 1946, but was an unsuccessful candidate for reelection in 1948, defeated by Democrat Earl Chudoff. During his term in office, he served in a Foreign Affairs sub-committee that examined the cultures of other nations and traveled extensively abroad, visiting such places as France and Great Britain. He was a supporter of the new state of Israel and opposed plans to further divide Palestine.

Maloney served as an esteemed lawyer in the Philadelphia area for 25 years. He was also a member of the Merchant Marines and the Fisheries Committee.

Today his relatives live in Bucks County, PA.

Sources

Temple University Beasley School of Law alumni
1899 births
1958 deaths
Politicians from Philadelphia
Republican Party members of the United States House of Representatives from Pennsylvania
20th-century American politicians